Brother Officers is a 1915 British silent war film directed by Harold M. Shaw and starring Henry Ainley, Lettice Fairfax and Gerald Ames. It was based on a play by Leo Trevor. A soldier wins the Victoria Cross during the First World War.

A British made film distributed by Paramount in the United States.

Cast
 Henry Ainley – John Hinds 
 Lettice Fairfax – Baroness Honour Royden 
 Gerald Ames – Lieutenant Lancelot Pleydell 
 Charles Rock – Jim Stanton 
 George Bellamy – Colonel Stapleton 
 Frank Stanmore – Dean 
 Wyndham Guise – Bookmaker 
 Gwynne Herbert – Lady Pleydell

References

External links

1915 films
British war films
British films based on plays
Films directed by Harold M. Shaw
British silent feature films
British black-and-white films
1915 war films
1910s English-language films
1910s British films